Romeo and Juliet (translit. Romeo i Dzhulyetta) is a 1955 Soviet ballet film directed by Lev Arnshtam. The film was based on the 1940 production of Prokofiev's ballet, choreographed by Leonid Lavrovsky.  It was entered into the 1955 Cannes Film Festival, where it won the Best Lyrical Film and was nominated as the Palme d'Or.

Plot summary

Cast
 Galina Ulanova as Juliet
 Yuri Zhdanov as Romeo (as Yu. Zhdanov)
 I. Olenina as Juliet's nurse
 Aleksandr Radunsky as Lord Capulet (as A. Radunsky)
 Ye. Ilyushchenko as Lady Capulet
 Aleksey Yermolayev as Tybalt
 Sergei Koren as Mercutio (as S. Koren)
 V. Kudryashov as Benvolio
 L. Loshchilin as Friar Laurence
 Aleksandr Lapauri as Paris (as A. Lapauri)

References

External links
 
 
 

1955 films
Soviet musical drama films
Soviet ballet films
Films directed by Lev Arnshtam
Films based on Romeo and Juliet
1950s musical drama films
1955 drama films